James Thayer (born 1949) is an American author.

James Thayer may also refer to:

James Thayer (Medal of Honor) (1853–1886), United States Navy sailor and Medal of Honor recipient
James Bradley Thayer (1831–1902), American legal writer and scholar
James B. Thayer (1922–2018), brigadier general in the U.S. Army